Shottisham is a village and civil parish in the East Suffolk district, in the county of Suffolk. It lies in the Wilford Hundred, about four and a half miles south-east of Woodbridge, between the parishes of Sutton, Alderton, Ramsholt and Hollesley, in the Bawdsey peninsula. About three miles from the coast at Hollesley Bay and Shingle Street, the village street overlooks a slight hollow of meads and copses at the road crossing of Shottisham Creek, a tributary brook of the river Deben.

History 
The origins of Shottisham and its name can be traced back to Old English, being translated to 'Scot or *Sceot's homestead/village'. The earliest history of Shottisham is recorded in the 1086 Domesday Book and is described as being located in the Wilford Hundred. Shottisham had 24 households which was quite large compared to other nearby village parishes, containing 1 smallholder and 15 free men. The land was valued at £1.8, of which the overlords at this time were Edric of Laxfield and Godric of Peyton. St Margaret's, the medieval parish church, which has a square tower holding a single bell, was restored in 1845.

As of 1966 the church of St Margaret became a listed building by English Heritage.
Parish boundary records for Shottisham date back to 1831. The village then had 2,320 acres of land: however this figure had reduced by 1881 to 1,884 acres owing to parish boundary changes.

Population census data from 1801 records 161 inhabitants, and by the 2011 census this had risen to 197. The 1851 census shows the highest figure, with 372 people.

Occupational statistics from Census data show that in 1831 just over 60% of residents were employed as agricultural labourers. Retail and Handicrafts accounted for a further 28% of the population. The data for 1881 shows still the majority of men (around 66%) as agricultural labourers. The largest employment sector for women (20%) was in Domestic services of offices.

There are a number of listed buildings in Shottisham, not just St Margaret's parish church. The public house The Sorrel Horse is a grade two listed building as well as Shottisham Hall which also became a grade two listed building in August 1988.

In the 1870s, Shottisham was described as: 
Shottisham, a parish, with a village, in Woodbridge district, Suffolk; 4¼ miles SE of Woodbridge r. station. It has a post-office under Woodbridge.  The church was restored in 1867. There is a national school.

Present day 
Shottisham is a small village that is located between Woodbridge and Bawdsey.  There is no longer the general store, which also used to act as a post office ( this shop and Post Office closed early 1990s)). Shottisham has a church, a pub and a camp site. The church is dedicated to Saint Margaret of Antioch; the pub is named The Sorrel Horse. The total population is 197 according to the 2011 census. Due to Shottisham being located in a very rural area there is no national public bus service, however there is a private company who run a morning and evening timetable for residents of Shottisham who work in nearby Woodbridge.  The nearest train station to the village is Melton, which is on the line between Ipswich and Lowestoft.

The average asking price for a house in Shottisham is £440,600, which is high compared to the national average of £250,000.

The population of Shottisham has seen a move from the majority of the population working in agricultural to a spread in the distribution.  According to the 2011 census data for Shottisham the highest three employment sectors are Primary education with 14%, Human health and Social work activities with 9.5%, and wholesale and retail trade and repair of motor vehicles with 11%.

Local businesses 
The Sorrel Horse, is a pub that dates back to the 15th century. As of August 2011 it was bought collectively by the community, the shares that were sold managed to raise £450,000 to keep the Sorrel Horse open. 
St Margaret Camp-site, is a small caravan/camp site that has 30 pitches.

Education 
Shottisham contains no schools within the village itself, however several schools are located nearby. The two closest primary schools to Shottisham are Hollesley Primary School which is 2.5 miles from the village and Bawdsey Primary school which is 4.2 miles from the village. Both schools educate students from the ages 4 to 11. As regards to secondary education pupils would have to travel to nearby Farlingaye High School which educates students from the ages of 11–18. The current Headmaster is Dr A Sievewright.  Woodbridge school is a private school which educates students from the ages of 4 to 18.
As of 2019 the current Head of Woodbridge school is Mrs Shona Norman.

References

External links 
ukvillages.co.uk

		

Villages in Suffolk
Civil parishes in Suffolk